Men's Artistic Gymnasts are men who participate in the sport of gymnastics, specifically artistic gymnastics.  Men first competed in Gymnastics at the Summer Olympics in 1896.  This list is of those who are considered to be notable in men's artistic gymnastics.  See gymnasium (ancient Greece) for the origin of the word gymnast from gymnastikos.



A

B

C

E

F

G

H

I

J

L

Luxembourg
 Mathias Logelin, two-time Olympian (1928, 1936), and medalist at the 1934 World Artistic Gymnastics Championships.

M

N

R

S

U

See also
List of gymnasts
International Gymnastics Hall of Fame
List of Olympic medalists in gymnastics (men)

Notes

References 

Gymnastics-related lists
Men's Artistic